Mabel's Dramatic Career is a 1913 American short comedy film starring Mabel Normand and Mack Sennett while featuring Roscoe Arbuckle in a cameo. The film features a film within a film and uses multiple exposure to show a film being projected in a cinema.

Cast
 Mabel Normand as Mabel, the kitchen maid
 Mack Sennett as Mack
 Alice Davenport as Mack's mother
 Virginia Kirtley as Mabel's rival
 Charles Avery as Farmer
 Ford Sterling as Actor / Onscreen villain
 Roscoe Arbuckle as Man in cinema audience
 Billy Jacobs as Mabel's son (as Paul Jacobs)
 Charles Inslee as Film Director
 The Keystone Cops

See also
 Fatty Arbuckle filmography

References

External links

 Mabel's Dramatic Career on YouTube
Mabel's Dramatic Career at Internet Archive

1913 films
1913 comedy films
1913 short films
Silent American comedy films
American silent short films
American black-and-white films
Films directed by Mack Sennett
Films produced by Mack Sennett
American comedy short films
1910s American films